During the 2000–01 English football season, Leicester City F.C. competed in the FA Premier League (known as the FA Carling Premiership for sponsorship reasons).

Season summary
A superb start to the season saw Leicester City begin October on top of the league just four months after the appointment of Peter Taylor as Martin O'Neill's successor - they had not occupied top place since 1963. Two weeks later, they surrendered their lead to Manchester United but were still in the top four by Christmas. By the midway point of the league season, the Foxes were third in the table with 35 points.

However, their impressive league form soon wore off, and they would only collect another 13 points in the second half of the season. Notably, an upset to Division Two underdogs Wycombe Wanderers in the FA Cup quarter-final midway through March had a negative effect on the Foxes, who endured 9 defeats and attained one win from their final 10 games, collecting only 3 points from a possible 30 and losing 8 consecutive league games. This slump dragged them down to 13th place - their lowest finish since winning promotion to the Premiership back in 1996. Several high-profile end-of-season signings - including that of Chelsea legend Dennis Wise - gave fans hope that Leicester could regain their form and rejoin the challenge for honours in 2001–02.

November saw the announcement of plans to relocate to a new 32,000-seat stadium at a site adjacent to Filbert Street, with a targeted completion for the start of the 2003–04 season. Later in the season, it was announced that Leicester would only have to spend one more season at Filbert Street before they could move into their new home.

Final league table

Results summary

Results by round

Results
Leicester City's score comes first

Legend

Pre-season

FA Premier League

FA Cup

League Cup

UEFA Cup

First-team squad
Squad at end of season

Left club during season

Reserve squad

Staff
{|class="wikitable"
|-
!Position
!Staff
|-
||President|| Terence Shipman
|-
||Director & Chairman|| John Elsom
|-
||Director|| Martin George
|-
|Chief operating officer & finance director|| Steve Kind
|-
|First-team manager|| Peter Taylor
|-
|First-team coach|| Steve Butler
|-
|Goalkeeping coach|| Jim McDonagh
|-
|Reserve team coach|| Garry Parker
|-
|Head academy coach|| Steve Beaglehole
|-
|Head academy goalkeeping coach|| Richard Hartis
|-
|rowspan="3"|Physiotherapists|| Ian Andrews
|-
| Dave Rennie
|-
| Mick Yeoman
|-
|Football coordinator|| Colin Murphy
|-
|Club doctor|| Ian Patchett
|-
|Academy head of recruitment|| Mick Raynor
|-
|Youth Academy director|| Alan Hill
|-
|rowspan="2"|Youth Academy Assistant Directors|| Jon Rudkin
|-
| Daral Pugh

Transfers

In

Out

Transfers in:  £16,300,000
Transfers out:  £6,250,000
Total spending:  £10,050,000

Loan in

Loan out

Statistics

Appearances, goals and cards
(Starting appearances + substitute appearances)
Players with squad numbers struck through and marked  left the club during the playing season.
Players with names in italics and marked * were on loan from another club for the whole of their season with Leicester.

References

Leicester City F.C. seasons
Leicester City